Knyagininsky District is an administrative district (raion), one of the forty in Nizhny Novgorod Oblast, Russia. Municipally, it is incorporated as Knyagininsky Municipal District. It is located in the east of the oblast. Its administrative center is the town of Knyaginino. Population: 11,922 (2010 Census);  The population of Knyaginino accounts for 56.3% of the district's total population.

History
The district was established in 1944.

References

Notes

Sources

Districts of Nizhny Novgorod Oblast
States and territories established in 1944
 
